Kasarwadi is a Pune Metro station in Pimpri-Chinchwad, India. The station was opened on 6 March 2022 as an inauguration of Pune Metro.Currently Purple Line is operational between PCMC and Phugewadi.

Station Layout

References

Pune Metro stations
Railway stations in India opened in 2022